Nuno Álvares Pereira was the 5th Governor of Portuguese Ceylon. de Meneses was appointed in 1616 under Philip II of Portugal, he was Governor until 1618. He was succeeded by Constantino de Sá de Noronha.

References

Governors of Portuguese Ceylon
16th-century Portuguese people
17th-century Portuguese people